Meripilus sumstinei, commonly known as the giant polypore or the black-staining polypore, is a species of fungus in the family Meripilaceae. Originally described in 1905 by 
William Alphonso Murrill as Grifola sumstinei, it was transferred to Meripilus in 1988. It is found in North America, where it grows in large clumps on the ground around the base of oak trees and tree stumps. The mushroom is edible.

References

Edible fungi
Fungi described in 1904
Fungi of North America
Meripilaceae
Taxa named by William Alphonso Murrill